Spalangia is a genus of parasitoid wasp in the family Pteromalidae. Species include Spalangia cameroni and Spalangia endius.

References 

Pteromalidae